Jhangi Sayedan is a village and union council situated in the Islamabad Capital Territory of Pakistan. Its geographical coordinates are 33° 37' 32 North, 72° 57' 6 East. The village is named after the Sayyid tribe, who make up the majority of the population.

References 

Union councils of Islamabad Capital Territory
Villages in Islamabad Capital Territory